The Chicago Grand Prix may refer to:

Peak Antifreeze Indy 300, an IndyCar Series race at Chicagoland Speedway in Joliet, Illinois
Target Grand Prix, a CART race held from 1999 through 2002 at Sportsman's Park Racetrack
Chicago Grand Prix, a NASCAR Cup Series Street Race
Chicago Grand Prix (tennis), a tournament from 1985 through 1987